Moritz, Landgrave of Hesse (legally Moritz Friedrich Karl Emanuel Humbert Prinz und Landgraf von Hessen 6 August 1926 – 23 May 2013) was the son of Prince Philip, Landgrave of Hesse, and the head of the House of Brabant and the German House of Hesse.

Life

Landgrave Moritz was born at Racconigi Castle, in Italy. During the Second World War, Moritz's mother, Princess Mafalda of Savoy, was arrested by the Nazis for alleged subversive activities and died in the Buchenwald concentration camp in 1944 as a result of a U.S. bombing raid on the camp.

Prince Louis of Hesse and by Rhine, the last head of the Hesse-Darmstadt line, died in 1968, at which time Moritz's father succeeded him as head of the entire house. Moritz had been the head of the House of Hesse since the death of his father Philip on 25 October 1980.

Moritz was a world-famous art collector. He was also the proprietor of the Kronberg Palace Hotel up until his death.

He died of lung illness in a hospital in Frankfurt, Germany at age 86.

Marriage and children

Moritz married Princess Tatiana of Sayn-Wittgenstein-Berleburg. Their marriage took place in the summer of 1964 in Giessen and ended in divorce in 1974. They had four children.
 Mafalda Margarethe (born 6 July 1965). Married 1st Enrico dei Conti Marone Cinzano (born 5 April 1963, Turin) on 8 July 1989 (div. 1990) with no issue. Married 2nd Carlo Galdo (born 26 March 1954, Naples) on 19 December 1991 (div. 1999) and had two daughters. Married 3rd Ferdinando dei Conti Brachetti Peretti (born 13 January 1960, Rome) on 28 September 2000 (div. 2014) and had two sons.
 Heinrich Donatus Philipp Umberto (born 17 October 1966). Married Countess Floria Franziska von Faber-Castell (born 14 October 1974, Düsseldorf, Germany) on 25 April 2003 (civilly) and on 17 May 2003 (religiously) and has a daughter and two sons.
 Elena Elisabeth Madeleine (born 8 November 1967) has a daughter with Massimo Caiazzo (born 1976).
 Philip Robin (born 17 September 1970). Married Laetitia Bechtolf (born 5 May 1978, Wedel, Pinneberg, Schleswig-Holstein, Germany) on 5 May 2006 (civilly) and on 10 June 2006 (religiously) and has three children.

Ancestry

References

|-

|-

1926 births
2013 deaths
People from Racconigi
House of Hesse-Kassel
German art collectors
20th-century art collectors
21st-century art collectors
Princes of Hesse
Hoteliers